Bournemouth East is a parliamentary constituency in Dorset represented in the House of Commons of the UK Parliament since 2005 by Tobias Ellwood, a Conservative.

Constituency profile
The seat is mostly home to White British people and covers the eastern suburbs of Bournemouth including Muscliff, Springbourne and Southbourne. Residents' wealth is around average for the UK.

Boundaries 

1974–1983: The County Borough of Bournemouth wards of Boscombe East, Boscombe West, King's Park, Moordown North, Moordown South, Queen's Park, Southbourne, and West Southbourne.

1983–1997: The Borough of Bournemouth wards of Boscombe East, Boscombe West, Central, East Cliff, Littledown, Moordown, Muscliff, Queen's Park, Southbourne, Strouden Park, and West Southbourne.

1997–2010: The Borough of Bournemouth wards of Boscombe East, Boscombe West, Littledown, Moordown, Muscliff, Queen's Park, Southbourne, Strouden Park, and West Southbourne.

2010–present: The Borough of Bournemouth wards of Boscombe East, Boscombe West, East Cliff and Springbourne, East Southbourne and Tuckton, Littledown and Iford, Moordown, Queen's Park, Strouden Park, Throop and Muscliff, and West Southbourne.

The constituency is based on the eastern portion of Bournemouth, in Dorset, including the Southbourne district at the border of Christchurch, Boscombe, Throop, and Queen's Park.

Following boundary changes enacted at the 2010 general election, the western boundary of the constituency changed so that it aligned with ward boundaries (which had changed since the constituency boundary changes of the 1990s). The main changes saw Eastcliff brought into the constituency with the loss of part of east Winton.

Bournemouth Town Centre was in this constituency from 1983 to 1997.

Members of Parliament

Elections

Elections in the 2020s

Elections in the 2010s

Elections in the 2000s

Elections in the 1990s

Elections in the 1980s

Elections in the 1970s

See also 
 List of parliamentary constituencies in Dorset

Notes

References

External links 
nomis Constituency Profile for Bournemouth East — presenting data from the ONS annual population survey and other official statistics.

Parliamentary constituencies in Dorset
Politics of Bournemouth
Constituencies of the Parliament of the United Kingdom established in 1974